Ľudmila Králiková (born 31 December 1953) is a Czech basketball player. She competed in the women's tournament at the 1976 Summer Olympics.

References

1953 births
Living people
Czech women's basketball players
Olympic basketball players of Czechoslovakia
Basketball players at the 1976 Summer Olympics
Sportspeople from Bratislava